DYWIDAG Systems (DSI) is a global technology group in the construction and mining sectors. The DSI Holding GmbH is based in Munich.

References

External links
 

Construction and civil engineering companies of Germany
Construction and civil engineering companies established in 1979
German companies established in 1979